In drama and other art forms, the central conceit of a work of fiction is the underlying fictitious assumption which must be accepted by the audience with suspension of disbelief so the plot may be seen as plausible. 

An example from popular culture is the way many cartoons feature animals that can speak to each other, and in many cases can understand human speech, but humans cannot understand the speech of animals. This conceit is seen, and sometimes exploited for plot purposes, in such films as Over the Hedge, the Balto series, and Brother Bear.

See also

References
Conceit Usage Examples at YourDictionary.com

Narratology